The 1997 European Athletics Junior Championships were held in Ljubljana, Slovenia on July 24–27.

Men's results

Women's results

Medal table

References
Results - GBR Athletics
Results - GBR Athletics

European Athletics U20 Championships
International athletics competitions hosted by Slovenia
European Junior
1997 in Slovenian sport
1997 in European sport
1997 in youth sport
Sports competitions in Ljubljana